The K League Most Valuable Player Award is a football award for players in K League. The award is given to the player deemed the most valuable player in the league each season.

K League 1 winners (1983–present)

K League 2 winners (2013–present)

See also
 K League
 K League Top Scorer Award
 K League Top Assist Provider Award
 K League Manager of the Year Award
 K League Young Player of the Year Award
 K League FANtastic Player
 K League Best XI
 K League Players' Player of the Year

External links
 All-time winners at K League 
 History at K League 

K League Most Valuable Player Award
MVP
Annual events in South Korea
Association football player non-biographical articles
Association football player of the year awards by competition
Most valuable player awards